Bourgeoys may refer to:

 Marguerite Bourgeoys (1620–1700), Catholic saint, founder of the Congregation of Notre Dame
 Marguerite-Bourgeoys, a provincial electoral district in Quebec, Canada
 Marguerite Bourgeoys Museum (Montreal)
 Marin le Bourgeoys (c. 1550–1634), invented the flintlock mechanism

See also 
 
 Bourgeois (disambiguation)